The First League of the Republika Srpska 2006–07 was the 12th since its establishment.

League table

External links 
 FSRS official website.

Bos
2006–07 in Bosnia and Herzegovina football
First League of the Republika Srpska seasons